The Man I Love (1929) is a part-talking sound film from Paramount Pictures produced in parallel silent and sound versions. This film survives in a copy sold to television in the 1950s. The film stars Richard Arlen. Some sources refer to this as Arlen's first sound film, but he co-starred Nancy Carroll in Dorothy Arzner's Manhattan Cocktail (1928), another part-talking picture released by Paramount.

Plot
A prizefighter (Arlen) is struggling to be a champ and is in love with a good girl (Brian), but also involved with a society beauty (Baclanova) at the same time.

Cast 
 Richard Arlen as Dum-Dum Brooks
 Mary Brian as Celia Fields
 Olga Baclanova as Sonia Barondoff 
 Harry Green as Curly Bloom
 Jack Oakie as Lew Layton
 Pat O'Malley as D.J. McCarthy
 Leslie Fenton as Carlo Vesper
 Charles Sullivan as Champ Mahoney

Soundtrack
 "Celia" (music by Richard A. Whiting and lyrics by Leo Robin)

External links

The Man I Love at SilentEra

1929 films
1929 comedy films
American comedy films
American black-and-white films
1920s English-language films
Films directed by William A. Wellman
Paramount Pictures films
Transitional sound films
Films with screenplays by Herman J. Mankiewicz
1920s American films